Mociūnai (formerly) is a village in Kėdainiai district municipality, in Kaunas County, in central Lithuania. According to the 2011 census, the village had a population of 28 people. It is located 2.5 km from Kalnaberžė, by the deep valleys of Kruostas and Skaudinis rivers. There is an Old Believers cemetery in the village. Mociūnai Forest Botanical Sanctuary is located 2 km away from the village, in Kalnaberžė Forest.

Demography

Images

References

Villages in Kaunas County
Kėdainiai District Municipality